George Bradley Maule (born October 11, 1951) is an American actor best known for his role as Tony Jones on the American television serial General Hospital. He played the role from 1984 until February 2006.

Acting Roles
REDEARTH88 (Gregory Atkins - 2007) 
General Hospital (Dr. Tony Jones, 1984 - February 10, 2006, November 2019)
7th Heaven (12 episodes, 2002–2005)
The Young and the Restless (Reverend Palmer, 2004)
Passions (Dr. Able, 2003)
Port Charles (Dr. Tony Jones - 1997, 1999, 2000)
Too Soon for Jeff (1996)
Buffalo Bill (1984)
Malibu (1983)
Three's Company (1981)
Charlie's Angels (1980–1981)
The Last Married Couple In America (1980)
Barbary Coast (1978)

References

External links
 
 Interview with Brad Maule on (re)Search my Trash

1951 births
American male soap opera actors
Living people
People from Rotan, Texas
Stephen F. Austin State University alumni
Stephen F. Austin State University faculty